The Seaboard Air Line Railroad's Sarasota Subdivision (W Line) was a rail line that ran from the company's main line at Turkey Creek south to Palmetto, Bradenton, Sarasota, and Venice.  The line was built in phases from 1901 to 1911.

History

Early years

The Sarasota Subdivision was one of the first major expansions of the Seaboard Air Line Railroad network in Florida.  All of Seaboard's lines in Florida prior to this were part of the Florida Central and Peninsular Railroad network, which the Seaboard acquired in 1900.

The Seaboard Air Line organized a subsidiary United States & West Indies Railroad and Steamship Company in 1901 to oversee construction of the line.  In 1901, construction commenced with the line branching off the Seaboard main line near Turkey Creek. It proceeded south through Durant, Willow, and Palmetto. It crossed the Manatee River via a long swing bridge into Bradenton, which was located just east of the current Desoto Bridge.  From Bradenton the line continued south to downtown Sarasota. Here, some of the line ran along the former right of way of the Arcadia, Gulf Coast and Lakeland Railroad, an earlier unsuccessful railroad between Bradenton and Sarasota.  The line also had a spur to Terra Ceia, as well as spurs into the central areas of Ellenton, Palmetto, and Bradenton (known then as Bradentown).

The Seaboard Air Line operated the line's first train to Sarasota on March 23, 1903. Upon completion, the United States & West Indies Railroad and Steamship Company was renamed the Florida West Shore Railway.  By 1905, the line was extended east from downtown into Fruitville. In 1909, Seaboard fully acquired the Florida West Shore Railway subsidiary, ending the Florida West Shore Railway's separate corporate identity.

Extension to Venice
The Seaboard Air Line extended the line south to Venice in 1911 after being convinced by local socialite Bertha Honoré Palmer who owned land in Venice.  In Venice, the line connected with a small logging railroad operated by the Manasota Lumber Co.  The extension to Venice greatly benefited the city's economy.  The railroad would be used by cadets and faculty of the Kentucky Military Institute's Venice campus for winter classes from 1933 to 1970.  It also transported patients to Fred H. Albee's Florida Medical Center from 1932 to 1942 and transported goods and servicemen to Venice Army Air Field during .  Another major customer on the line would be the Ringling Bros. and Barnum & Bailey Circus, which was headquartered in Sarasota from 1927 to 1959 and then in Venice from 1959 to 1990.

By 1925, at the height of the Florida land boom of the 1920s, Seaboard considered extending the line further south through Englewood along Lemon Bay to Placida to intercept with their Boca Grande Subdivision (the former Charlotte Harbor and Northern Railway).  The extension was never built.

Later years

By the 1940s, the Seaboard Air Line removed the segment between the main line at Turkey Creek and Durant at the north end.  The Seaboard's Valrico Cutoff, which was built in 1925 and crossed the Sarasota Subdivision at Durant, was then used to access the line and provided a slightly shorter route to Tampa.  By then, two local passenger trains were running the line daily in addition to a through freight train from Durant to Palmetto which ran six days a week.

The SAL ran a section of its Silver Meteor, from Tampa to Bradenton, Sarasota and Venice on the SAL's Venice Division. The Silver Meteor offered through coaches and sleepers (no transfer needed) from New York City on this section.

In 1967, the Seaboard Air Line (SAL) merged with their rival, the Atlantic Coast Line Railroad (ACL), who operated a nearly parallel route closer to the coast (the Tampa Southern Railroad).  By April of 1968, the company abandoned the ex-SAL track within Downtown Sarasota and consolidated all service between Shade Avenue and 12th Street on the former Atlantic Coast Line tracks.  All passenger traffic was also consolidated at the former Atlantic Coast Line passenger depot at Main Street and School Avenue.  Additionally, the SAL's swing bridge over the Manatee River was also removed in the wake of the merger in an effort to consolidate the company's operation on to a single bridge crossing (which also resulted in the removal of track between Palmetto Junction and Bradenton Junction).  The Seaboard Coast Line then designated the remaining track north of the Manatee River as the Parrish Subdivision, and track south of the river became part of the Palmetto Subdivision (which also included the former Atlantic Coast Line route).  The Parrish Subdivision became a freight-only route after the merger.  

Passenger operations from Tampa to Venice in the combined network was provided by the Champion once daily.  The Champion ran from Tampa to Bradenton on the former Atlantic Coast Line route, but still ran on the remaining Seaboard Air Line track from Bradenton to Venice (except through downtown Sarasota).  Passenger service was discontinued in the Sarasota area after the Seaboard Coast Line's passenger operations were taken over by Amtrak in 1971.

In 1970, the Parrish Subdivision became the original route of the Tropicana Juice Train which brought fresh orange juice in insulated boxcars from Bradenton to Kearny, New Jersey six days a week.  Seaboard Coast Line would later reroute the juice train through Tampa on the Palmetto Subdivision (former Atlantic Coast Line) where it operates today.

In 1980, the Seaboard Coast Line's parent company merged with the Chessie System, creating the CSX Corporation.  The CSX Corporation initially operated the Chessie and Seaboard Systems separately until 1986, when they were merged into CSX Transportation.  In 1986, in an effort to further consolidate the network, track was abandoned between Durant and Willow. Though, the bridge over the Little Manatee River still stands with the tracks removed.

Current conditions

From Willow to Palmetto, the line is still in service as CSX's Parrish Spur. The former spur in Palmetto now connects the line to the Palmetto Subdivision main track (the ex-ACL line).  The right of way of the Parrish Spur north and east of Ellenton is now largely owned by Florida Power and Light, and the Florida Railroad Museum operates excursion trains on this segment from Parrish to Willow.

South of Bradenton, CSX continues to operates the line as part of their Palmetto Subdivision from the north end of Tropicana Yard south to Oneco.  The short line Seminole Gulf Railway took over the rest of the remaining line south of Oneco to Venice in 1987.  Seminole Gulf abandoned the line from Venice to Palmer Ranch in 2004, and the line from there to Sarasota was abandoned in 2019.  The Legacy Trail now runs on the former right of way from the Venice Depot to Fruitville Road in Sarasota.  The remaining right of way south of the Venice Depot is now home to the Venice Urban Forest.

Historic stations

Notes

References

Defunct Florida railroads
1901 establishments in Florida
Seaboard Air Line Railroad